Carole Montillet-Carles (born 7 April 1973) is a French World Cup alpine ski racer and Olympic gold medalist.

Career
Born in Corrençon-en-Vercors, Isère, she became a member of the Villard-de-Lans ski club in Grenoble. At her Olympic debut in 1998 at Nagano, Japan, she finished 14th in both the super-G and downhill.

In January 2002, Montillet was chosen by the Comité National Olympique et Sportif Français to be the flag bearer at Salt Lake City. Her victory in the downhill days later was her first major triumph and the first alpine gold medal by a Frenchwoman since Marielle Goitschel's slalom gold in Grenoble in 1968. She dedicated the win to her late teammate Régine Cavagnoud, the reigning world champion in super-G, who died after a training accident less than four months earlier.

Montillet's achievements were more remarkable because she has suffered multiple serious injuries early in her career, such as torn knee ligaments.

While training for the downhill at the 2006 Winter Olympics, Montillet-Carles crashed on 13 February and was evacuated by helicopter to a nearby hospital.  She suffered rib, back, and facial injuries, but still opted to defend her title two days later, but finished 28th. Several racers had complained that the downhill course was too easy, and Olympic organizers had made several changes to it. She finished fifth in the super-G five days later, then retired from competition at the end of the World Cup season.

World Cup results

Season titles

Season standings

Race victories
8 wins – (4 DH, 4 SG)
25 podiums – (13 DH, 12 SG)

World Championship results

Olympic results

External links
 
 Carole Montillet-Carles World Cup standings at the International Ski Federation 
 
 
 
 
 Biography at Yahoo.com 
 Official website 

1973 births
Living people
Sportspeople from Isère
French female alpine skiers
Alpine skiers at the 1998 Winter Olympics
Alpine skiers at the 2002 Winter Olympics
Alpine skiers at the 2006 Winter Olympics
Olympic gold medalists for France
Olympic alpine skiers of France
Olympic medalists in alpine skiing
FIS Alpine Ski World Cup champions
Medalists at the 2002 Winter Olympics
Regional councillors of Auvergne-Rhône-Alpes